Acebal is a town (comuna) in the south of the province of Santa Fe, Argentina,  from Rosario and  south of the provincial capital Santa Fe.

The town was founded in 1890 by Amador Acebal. The local administration was formally created on 19 December 1895.

The land where the town is today belonged to Amador Acebal and his wife, María Saa Pereyra de Acebal. And they donated them to the then Central Argentine Railway for the laying of the tracks of the Rosario - Peyrano line . The couple made it a condition that a station be established within their fields, inaugurated in February 1891. Months before, on July 22, 1890, a decree from the Santa Fe Government approved the plans for the newly founded town. Later, on December 19, 1895, the Development Commission was created.

It is known as the national footwear capital. The sector represents almost 60 percent of the town's activity. In 2017, the drop in sales and imports reduced production to less than half, causing a serious crisis.

References
 
 

Populated places in Santa Fe Province